George Sibley may refer to:

 George Sibley Johns (1857–1941), American journalist
 George Sibley (1942–2005), second husband of American convicted murderer Lynda Lyon Block
 George Sibley, a character from the American drama television series Six Feet Under
 George C. Sibley (1782–1863), American explorer, soldier, Indian agent, and politician